Shaheed Ganj Mosque, originally named the Abdullah Khan Mosque, was a mosque in Lahore, Punjab, Pakistan. The Mosque was commissioned in 1722 during the reign of Mughal Emperor Muhammad Shah and built by Abdullah Khan construction was completed in 1753 during the reign of Ahmad Shah Bahadur. It was constructed next to the shrine of Pir Shah Kaku. Sikh rule began in 1762, the Gurdwara Bhai Taru Singh was built afterwards within the same grounds. The mosque site was under dispute during British rule, but was demolished by Sikhs on the night of 8 July 1935.

History

Construction of mosque 
Abdullah Khan Mosque was built by Abdullah Khan during the reign of Mughal Emperor Muhammad Shah. Khan was a cook of Prince Dara Shikoh, elder son of Shah Jahan, in 1743 AD, who rose up to the position of kotwal (Chief police officer) of Lahore for his services. It was completed in 1722 (1134 AH) by the Falak Beg Khan, and was built in the premises of the shrine to Pir Shah Kaku.

Sikh rule and occupation/destruction of the mosque
There was a public square near the mosque, where criminals were punished during the tenure of Nawab Zakariya Khan Bahadur, a Mughal governor of the Punjab in the 18th century. Taru Singh, a Sikh man who aided Sikhs against the Mughals was executed. After that incident, the Sikhs officially declared Taru Singh a martyr and named the public square as the Shaheed Ganj (Martyr Square). 

In 1762, the Bhangi Misl Sikh army conquered Lahore and occupied the mosque, together with the public square. The Muslims were not allowed to enter and pray, although Sikhs were given the right to pray. The Sikhs built a gurdwara called Gurudwara Shaheed Bhai Taru Singh in remembrance of Sikh martyrs in the courtyard while the Mosque building was used as a residence for the Sikh priest.

British rule and demolition of the mosque
After British colonial occupation of the Punjab in 1849, The Mosque became an issue between Muslims and Sikhs again. Muslims protested against the Sikh occupation Shaheed Ganj Mosque. On April 17, 1850, Nur Ahmed, a Muslim resident of Lahore, claimed to be a mutawallī (trustee) of the mosque and filed a case in Punjab High Court. Nur Ahmed filed several suits between 1853 and 1883 to recover the Shaheed Ganj Mosque, but courts maintained the status quo.

On 29 June 1935, the Sikhs announced that they would demolish the Shaheed Ganj Mosque. Several thousand Muslims assembled in front of the mosque to protect it and Anjuman-i Tahaffuz-i Masjid Shahidganj (Organization for the protection of the Shaheedgunj Mosque) was formed. Sir Herbert Emerson, the Governor of the Punjab, tried to negotiate to find mutually acceptable solution. But, on the night of 7 July 1935 the Sikhs demolished the mosque, minutes of British India Privy Council say "by or with the connivance of its Sikh custodians", leading to riots and disorder in Lahore.

Muslim reactions
Jamaat Ali Shah (1834–1951), born in Alipur Sharif Dist, Sialkot, Pakistan, led the Shaheed Ganj Mosque movement.
After the mosque’s demolition, the Muslims held a public meetings on 19–20 July at the Badshahi Mosque, and marched directly on the Shaheedganj mosque. Police opened fire on the crowd on 20 July. The Muslims fled from the Shahidganj mosque and dispersed on 21 July, after more than a dozen had been killed.

Court case
The judgement of Bombay High Court on 2 May 1940 on 'Masjid Shahid Ganj Mosque vs Shiromani Gurdwara Parbandhak'  recognized the building as a Mosque but maintained that the Statute of limitations has passed since the property has been occupied by the Sikhs for more than 170 years.

Architecture 
The mosque had three domes each accompanied by a minaret and five arches. It had a courtyard and an orchard of fruit trees.

See also
Dulla Bhatti

References

External links
 Shahidganj Mosque Issue and the Muslims Response: 1935-1936
 Lessons for Ayodhya from Lahore gurdwara
 1940 verdict in Lahore gurdwara case may play key role in deciding Ayodhya dispute
 Shaheed Ganj Mosque
 Mosque and gurdwara face off at Naulakha
 Tahrik-i Masjid-i Shahid Ganj
 Don’t revive Shaheed Ganj issue
 Shaheed Gunj Masjid Map
 The story of the Shahidganj Mosque in Lahore
 Lahore’s Gurdwara Shahid Ganj: Lesson for Ayodhya
 
 Masjid Shahid Ganj and Historical Conflict c. 1935
 Ayodhya verdict may be like Lahore judgment
 Muslim Political Discourse in Postcolonial India

1722 establishments in India
Religious buildings and structures completed in 1722
Mosques in Lahore
Mughal mosques
Walled City of Lahore
Destroyed mosques
Attacks on religious buildings and structures in Pakistan